Arrhenes marnas, the affinis skipper or swamp darter, is a butterfly of the family Hesperiidae. The species was described by Felder in 1860. It is found from Queensland to Papua.

The larvae feed on Leesia hexandra.

Subspecies
Arrhenes marnas marnas
Arrhenes marnas affinis (north-east coastal strip of Queensland)

External links
Australian Insects
Papua Insects Foundation

Taractrocerini
Butterflies described in 1860